The Extra Beat Boys were a British audio engineering and production duo for Pete Waterman's label PWL which consisted of Jamie Bromfield and Boyowa 'Yoyo' Olugbo. Record Mirror reported in June 1988 that Yoyo had left to engineer exclusively for Stock, Aitken & Waterman and Kevin O'Reordan replaced him.

Since 1987, the duo mixed many Stock Aitken Waterman hit song productions such as Rick Astley's "Never Gonna Give You Up", Kylie Minogue's "Got to Be Certain" and "The Loco-Motion", Dollar's "O L'amour", Brother Beyond's "The Harder I Try", "He Ain't No Competition" and "Can You Keep a Secret?", as well as Marc Almond's "Bitter Sweet (The Big Beat Mix)", among others.

Working outside of the Extra Beat Boys, Bromfield, Olugbo and O'Reordan have produced and mixed tracks alongside producer/engineer Phil Harding. Among Bromfield's works with Harding are Climie Fisher's "Rise to the Occasion", Shooting Party's "I Go to Pieces", Rick and Lisa's "When You Gonna" and Shanice's "I'll Bet She's Got a Boyfriend". Bromfield, O'Reordan and Harding remixed Belouis Some's "Imagination" on the single release of "Some Girls" (the 'Can U Dig This Mix'). Olugbo has co-written/co-produced tracks for many artists; together with Harding, they mixed Jermaine Stewart's "Tren de Amor", then later on Olugbo worked on tracks such as the Brand New Heavies' "You Are the Universe", BoA's "I'm OK", Emma Bunton's "Breathing", Hear'Say's "Another Lover" and S Club's "Straight from the Heart".

References

External links

Yoyo on Discogs
Jamie Bromfield on Discogs
Kevin O'Reordan on Discogs

English audio engineers
British record production teams
Remixers
Record production duos
English musical duos